Cape Canaveral Space Force Station (CCSFS) is an installation of the United States Space Force's Space Launch Delta 45, located on Cape Canaveral in Brevard County, Florida.

Headquartered at the nearby Patrick Space Force Base, the station is the primary launch site for the Space Force's Eastern Range with three launch pads currently active (Space Launch Complexes 37B, 40, and 41). The facility is south-southeast of NASA's Kennedy Space Center on adjacent Merritt Island, with the two linked by bridges and causeways. The Cape Canaveral Space Force Station Skid Strip provides a  runway close to the launch complexes for military airlift aircraft delivering heavy and outsized payloads to the Cape.

A number of American space exploration pioneers were launched from CCSFS, including the first U.S. Earth satellite (1958), first U.S. astronaut (1961), first U.S. astronaut in orbit (1962), first two-man U.S. spacecraft (1965), first U.S. unmanned lunar landing (1966), and first three-man U.S. spacecraft (1968). It was also the launch site for all of the first spacecraft to (separately) fly past each of the planets in the Solar System (1962–1977), the first spacecraft to orbit Mars (1971) and roam its surface (1996), the first American spacecraft to orbit and land on Venus (1978), the first spacecraft to orbit Saturn (2004), and to orbit Mercury (2011), and the first spacecraft to leave the Solar System (1977).  Portions of the base have been designated a National Historic Landmark for their association with the early years of the American space program.

Cape Canaveral was known as Cape Kennedy Air Force Station from 1964 to 1974, and as Cape Canaveral Air Force Station from 1974 to 1994 and from 2000 to 2020. The facility was renamed "Cape Canaveral Space Force Station" in December, 2020.

History
The CCSFS area had been used by the United States government to test missiles since 1949, when President Harry S. Truman established the Joint Long Range Proving Ground at Cape Canaveral. The location was among the best in the continental United States for this purpose, as it allowed for launches out over the Atlantic Ocean, and is closer to the equator than most other parts of the United States, allowing rockets to get a boost from the Earth's rotation.

Air Force proving ground 

On June 1, 1948, the United States Navy transferred the former Banana River Naval Air Station to the United States Air Force, with the Air Force renaming the facility the Joint Long Range Proving Ground (JLRPG) Base on June 10, 1949. On October 1, 1949, the Joint Long Range Proving Ground Base was transferred from the Air Materiel Command to the Air Force Division of the Joint Long Range Proving Ground. On May 17, 1950, the base was renamed the Long Range Proving Ground Base but three months later was renamed Patrick Air Force Base, in honor of Army Maj Gen Mason Patrick. In 1951, the Air Force established the Air Force Missile Test Center.

Early American sub-orbital rocket flights were achieved at Cape Canaveral in 1956. These flights occurred shortly after sub-orbital flights launched from White Sands Missile Range, such as the Viking 12 sounding rocket on February 4, 1955.

Following the Soviet Union's successful Sputnik 1 (launched on October 4, 1957), the United States attempted its first launch of an artificial satellite from Cape Canaveral on December 6, 1957. However, the rocket carrying Vanguard TV3 exploded on the launch pad.

NASA was founded in 1958, and Air Force crews launched missiles for NASA from the Cape, known then as Cape Canaveral Missile Annex. Redstone, Jupiter, Pershing 1, Pershing 1a, Pershing II, Polaris, Thor, Atlas, Titan and Minuteman missiles were all tested from the site, the Thor becoming the basis for the expendable launch vehicle (ELV) Delta rocket, which launched Telstar 1 in July 1962. The row of Titan (LC-15, 16, 19, 20) and Atlas (LC-11, 12, 13, 14) launch pads along the coast came to be known as Missile Row in the 1960s.

Project Mercury 

NASA's first crewed spaceflight program was prepared for launch from Canaveral by U.S. Air Force crews. Mercury's objectives were to place a crewed spacecraft in Earth orbit, investigate human performance and ability to function in space, and safely recover the astronaut and spacecraft. Suborbital flights were launched by derivatives of the Army's Redstone missile from LC-5; two such flights were made by Alan Shepard on May 5, 1961, and Gus Grissom on July 21. Orbital flights were launched by derivatives of the Air Force's larger Atlas D missile from LC-14. The first American in orbit was John Glenn on February 20, 1962. Three more orbital flights followed through May 1963.

Flight control for all Mercury missions was provided at the Mercury Control Center located at Canaveral near LC-14.

Name changes 
On November 29, 1963, following the death of President John F. Kennedy, his successor Lyndon B. Johnson issued Executive Order 11129 renaming both NASA's Merrit Island Launch Operations Center and "the facilities of Station No. 1 of the Atlantic Missile Range" (a reference to the Cape Canaveral Missile Test Annex) as the "John F. Kennedy Space Center". He had also convinced Governor C. Farris Bryant (D-Fla.) to change the name of Cape Canaveral to Cape Kennedy.  This resulted in some confusion in public perception, which conflated the two. NASA Administrator James E. Webb clarified this by issuing a directive stating the Kennedy Space Center name applied only to Merrit Island, while the Air Force issued a general order renaming the Air Force launch site Cape Kennedy Air Force Station. This name was used through the Project Gemini and early Apollo program.

However, the geographical name change proved to be unpopular, owing to the historical longevity of Cape Canaveral (one of the oldest place-names in the United States, dating to the early 1500s). In 1973 and 1974 respectively, both the geographical and the Air Force Station Cape names were reverted to Canaveral after the Florida legislature passed a bill changing the name back that was signed into law by Florida governor Reubin Askew (D-Fla.).

On August 7, 2020, U.S. military contracts referred to the installation as Cape Canaveral Space Force Station. The installation was formally renamed on 9 December 2020.

Gemini and early Apollo 

The two-man Gemini spacecraft was launched into orbit by a derivative of the Air Force Titan II missile. Twelve Gemini flights were launched from LC-19, ten of which were crewed. The first crewed flight, Gemini 3, took place on March 23, 1965. Later Gemini flights were supported by seven uncrewed launches of the Agena Target Vehicle on the Atlas-Agena from LC-14, to develop rendezvous and docking, critical for Apollo. Two of the Atlas-Agena vehicles failed to reach orbit on Gemini 6 and Gemini 9, and a mis-rigging of the nosecone on a third caused it to fail to eject in orbit, preventing docking on Gemini 9A. The final flight, Gemini 12, launched on November 11, 1966.

The capabilities of the Mercury Control Center were inadequate for the flight control needs of Gemini and Apollo, so NASA built an improved Mission Control Center in 1963, which it decided to locate at the newly built Manned Spacecraft Center in Houston, Texas, rather than at Canaveral or at the Goddard Space Flight Center in Maryland.

The Apollo program's goal of landing a man on the Moon required development of the Saturn family of rockets. The large Saturn V rocket necessary to take men to the Moon required a larger launch facility than Cape Canaveral could provide, so NASA built the Kennedy Space Center located west and north of Canaveral on Merrit Island. But the earlier Saturn I and IB could be launched from the Cape's Launch Complexes 34 and 37. The first four Saturn I development launches were made from LC-34 between October 27, 1961, and March 28, 1963. These were followed by the final test launch and five operational launches from LC-37 between January 29, 1964, and July 30, 1965.

The Saturn IB uprated the capability of the Saturn I, so that it could be used for Earth orbital tests of the Apollo spacecraft. Two uncrewed test launches of the Apollo command and service module (CSM), AS-201 and AS-202, were made from LC-34, and an uncrewed flight (AS-203) to test the behavior of upper stage liquid hydrogen fuel in orbit from LC-37, between February 26 and August 25, 1966. The first crewed CSM flight, AS-204 or Apollo 1, was planned to launch from LC-34 on February 21, 1967, but the entire crew of Gus Grissom, Ed White and Roger Chaffee were killed in a cabin fire during a spacecraft test on pad 34 on January 27, 1967. The AS-204 rocket was used to launch the uncrewed, Earth orbital first test flight of the Apollo Lunar Module, Apollo 5, from LC-37 on January 22, 1968. After significant safety improvements were made to the Command Module, Apollo 7 was launched from LC-34 to fulfill Apollo 1's mission, using Saturn IB AS-205 on October 11, 1968.

In 1972, NASA deactivated both LC-34 and LC-37. It briefly considered reactivating both for Apollo Applications Program launches after the end of Apollo, but instead modified the Kennedy Space Center launch complex to handle the Saturn IB for the Skylab and Apollo-Soyuz Test Project launches. The LC-34 service structure and umbilical tower were razed, leaving only the concrete launch pedestal as a monument to the Apollo 1 crew. In 2001, LC-37 was recommissioned and converted to service Delta IV launch vehicles.

Subsequent activity 
The Air Force chose to expand the capabilities of the Titan launch vehicles for its heavy lift capabilities. The Air Force constructed Launch Complexes 40 and 41 to launch Titan III and Titan IV rockets just south of Kennedy Space Center. A Titan III has about the same payload capacity as the Saturn IB at a considerable cost savings.

Launch Complex 40 and 41 have been used to launch defense reconnaissance, communications and weather satellites and NASA planetary missions. The Air Force also planned to launch two Air Force crewed space projects from LC 40 and 41. They were the Dyna-Soar, a crewed orbital rocket plane (canceled in 1963) and the USAF Manned Orbital Laboratory (MOL), a crewed reconnaissance space station (canceled in 1969).

From 1974 to 1977 the powerful Titan-Centaur became the new heavy lift vehicle for NASA, launching the Viking and Voyager series of spacecraft from Launch Complex 41. Complex 41 later became the launch site for the most powerful uncrewed U.S. rocket, the Titan IV, developed by the Air Force.

With increased use of a leased launch pad by private company SpaceX, the Air Force launch support operations at the Cape are planning for 21 launches in 2014, a fifty percent increase over the 2013 launch rate. SpaceX has reservations for a total of ten of those launches in 2014, with an option for an eleventh.

Uncrewed launches at Cape Canaveral

The first United States satellite launch, Explorer 1, was made by the Army Ballistic Missile Agency on February 1, 1958 (UTC) from Canaveral's LC-26A  using a Juno I RS-29 missile. NASA's first launch, Pioneer 1, came on October 11 of the same year from LC-17A using a Thor-Able rocket.

Besides Project Gemini, the Atlas-Agena launch complexes LC-12 and LC-13 were used during the 1960s for the uncrewed Ranger and Lunar Orbiter programs and the first five Mariner interplanetary probes. The Atlas-Centaur launch complex LC-36 was used for the 1960s Surveyor uncrewed lunar landing program and the last five Mariner probes through 1973.

NASA has also launched communications and weather satellites from Launch Complexes 40 and 41, built at the north end of the Cape in 1964 by the Air Force for its Titan IIIC and Titan IV rockets. From 1974 to 1977 the powerful Titan IIIE served as the heavy-lift vehicle for NASA, launching the Viking and Voyager series of planetary spacecraft and the Cassini–Huygens Saturn probe from LC-41.

Three Cape Canaveral pads are currently operated by private industry for military and civilian launches: SLC-41 for the Atlas V and SLC-37B for the Delta IV, both for United Launch Alliance heavy payloads; and SLC-40 for SpaceX Falcon 9.

Boeing X-37B

The Boeing X-37B, a reusable uncrewed spacecraft operated by USSF, which is also known as the Orbital Test Vehicle (OTV), has been successfully launched four times from Cape Canaveral.  The first four X-37B missions have been launched with Atlas V rockets.  Past launch dates for the X-37B spaceplane include April 22, 2010, March 5, 2011, December 11, 2012, and May 20, 2015.  The fourth X-37B mission landed at the Kennedy Space Center on May 7, 2017, after 718 days in orbit.  The first three X-37B missions all made successful autonomous landings from space to a  runway located at Vandenberg Space Force Base in California which was originally designed for Space Shuttle return from orbit operations.

Operations, infrastructure and facilities 

Of the launch complexes built since 1950, several have been leased and modified for use by private aerospace companies. Launch Complex SLC-17 was used for the Delta II Heavy variant, through 2011. Launch Complexes SLC-37 and SLC-41 were modified to launch EELV Delta IV and Atlas V launch vehicles, respectively.  These launch vehicles replaced all earlier Delta, Atlas, and Titan rockets. Launch Complex SLC-47 is used to launch weather sounding rockets. Launch Complex SLC-46 is reserved for use by Space Florida.

SLC-40 hosted the first launch of the SpaceX Falcon 9 in June 2010. Falcon 9 launches continued from this complex through 2015, consisting of uncrewed Commercial Resupply Services missions for NASA to the International Space Station as well as commercial satellite flights. SpaceX has also leased Launch Complex 39A from NASA and has completed modifying it to accommodate Falcon Heavy and Commercial Crew crewed spaceflights to the ISS with their Crew Dragon spacecraft in 2019. SpaceX Landing Zone 1 and 2, used to land first stages of the Falcon 9 and the side boosters of the Falcon Heavy, are located at the site of the former LC-13.

On September 16, 2015, NASA announced that Blue Origin has leased Launch Complex 36 and will modify it as a launch site for their next-generation launch vehicles.

In the case of low-inclination (geostationary) launches the location of the area at 28°27'N put it at a slight disadvantage against other launch facilities situated nearer the equator.

In the case of high-inclination (polar) launches, the latitude does not matter, but the Cape Canaveral area is not suitable, because inhabited areas underlie these trajectories; Vandenberg Space Force Base, Cape Canaveral's West coast counterpart, or the smaller Pacific Spaceport Complex – Alaska (PSCA) are used instead.

The Air Force Space and Missile Museum is located at LC-26. Hangar AE, located in the CCAFS Industrial Area, collects telemetry from launches all over the United States. NASA's Launch Services Program has three Launch Vehicle Data Centers (LVDC) within that display telemetry real-time for engineers.

Cape Canaveral Space Force Station Skid Strip 
The facility is owned by the United States Space Force (USSF).

This airport is assigned a three-letter location identifier of XMR by the Federal Aviation Administration, but it does not have an International Air Transport Association (IATA) airport code.

The runway was first called the Skid Strip because SM-62 Snark cruise missiles (which lacked wheels) returning from test flights were supposed to skid to a halt on it.

In the 1960s the Douglas C-133 Cargomaster was a frequent visitor, carrying modified Atlas and Titan missiles, used as launch vehicles for crewed and uncrewed space programs leading to the Apollo Moon landings.  The Skid Strip was used by NASA's Pregnant Guppy and Super Guppy transport aircraft carrying the S-IVB upper stage for the Saturn IB and Saturn V rockets used in Apollo program.

Today, it is predominantly used by USAF C-130 Hercules, C-17 Globemaster III and C-5 Galaxy aircraft transporting satellite payloads to CCSFS for mating with launch vehicles.

The CCSFS Skid Strip is sometimes confused with the NASA Shuttle Landing Facility, but that runway, specially constructed for the Space Shuttle, is located on Merritt Island at the adjacent Kennedy Space Center.

Naval Ordnance Test Unit 
A tenant command located at Cape Canaveral SFS is the U.S. Navy's Naval Ordnance Test Unit (NOTU). As a major shore command led by a Navy captain, NOTU was created in 1950 and initially directed almost all of its efforts towards the development and subsequent support of the submarine-launched Fleet Ballistic Missile (FBM) program.  This resulted in NOTU being assigned to the Director, Special Projects (now Strategic Systems Programs) with a mission to support the development of the Polaris missile and later the Poseidon missile programs.

NOTU's mission is the support and testing of sea-based weapons systems for the United States Navy and the Royal Navy in a safe environment utilizing the airspace and waterspace of the Eastern Range.  The command directly supports the mission capability and readiness of the United States Navy's Trident Submarines as well as the Fleet Ballistic Missile program of the United Kingdom.  NOTU operates the Navy Port at Port Canaveral, supporting submarines and surface ships of the U.S. Atlantic Fleet, NATO, Allied and other foreign navies, and assets of the Military Sealift Command.  NOTU is composed of over 100 active duty U.S. Navy personnel and over 70 defense contractors.

Water
The base obtains potable water from the city of Cocoa. A single potable water line from Cocoa runs under the Sykes Creek Bridge at Sea Ray Drive.

Based units 
Units marked GSU are Air Force Geographically Separate Units which, although based at Cape Canaveral SFS, are subordinate to Space Launch Delta 45 headquarters at Patrick SFB.

United States Space Force 
Space Operations Command (SpOC)
 Space Launch Delta 45
 5th Space Launch Squadron – Atlas V and Delta IV
 45th Operations Group  (GSU) incorporating the former 45th Launch Group deactivated in 2018
 45th Range Squadron
 45th Space Communications Squadron
 45th Weather Squadron

United States Navy 
 Naval Ordnance Test Unit

Gallery

See also

 List of Cape Canaveral and Merritt Island launch sites

References

Sources

External links

Patrick Air Force Base
Cape Canaveral Air Force Station Virtual Tour
Air Force Space and Missile Museum Web site
"Cape Canaveral Lighthouse Shines Again" article and video interview about the lighthouse
Aviation: From Sand Dunes to Sonic Booms, a National Park Service Discover Our Shared Heritage Travel Itinerary

Key Events in Apollo
The Launch Pads of Cape Canaveral

 
Launch complexes of the United States Space Force
National Register of Historic Places in Brevard County, Florida
Historic districts on the National Register of Historic Places in Florida
Spaceports in the United States
National Historic Landmarks in Florida
Historic American Engineering Record in Florida
1948 establishments in Florida